This article contains a list of insect pests of millets primarily derived from Kalaisekar (2017).

Millet species
All of the millet species listed below belong to the grass famly, Poaceae. Most species generally referred to as millets belong to the subfamily Panicoideae, but some millets also belong to various other taxa. Major millets are in bold.

Eragrostideae tribe in the subfamily Chloridoideae:
 Eleusine coracana: Finger millet
 Eragrostis tef: Teff

Paniceae tribe in the subfamily Panicoideae:
 Genus Panicum:
 Panicum miliaceum: Proso millet (common millet, broomcorn millet)
 Panicum sumatrense: Little millet
 Pennisetum glaucum: Pearl millet
 Setaria italica: Foxtail millet
 Genus Digitaria
 Digitaria exilis: White fonio
 Digitaria compacta: Raishan
 Genus Echinochloa: barnyard millets
 Echinochloa esculenta: Japanese barnyard millet
 Echinochloa frumentacea: Indian barnyard millet
 Echinochloa crus-galli: Common barnyard grass
 Paspalum scrobiculatum: Kodo millet
 Genus Brachiaria
 Brachiaria deflexa: Guinea millet
 Brachiaria ramosa: Browntop millet

Andropogoneae tribe, also in the subfamily Panicoideae:
 Sorghum bicolor: Sorghum
 Coix lacryma-jobi: Job's tears

Lepidoptera
Family Crambidae
Leaf folders, Cnaphalocrocis
Rice leaf folder, Cnaphalocrocis medinalis
Cnaphalocrocis patnalis
Marasmia trapezalis
Spotted stem borer, Chilo partellus
Sugarcane stalk borer, Chilo auricilius
Sugarcane early shoot borer, Chilo infuscatellus
Sugarcane internode borer, Chilo sacchariphagus
Asian corn borer, Ostrinia furnacalis
Millet stem borer, Coniesta ignefusalis
Corn borer, Diatraea grandiosella
Family Erebidae
Subfamily Arctiinae
Amsacta albistriga
Amsacta lactinea
Amsacta moorei
Barsine roseororatus
Creatonotos gangis
Conogethes punctiferalis
Cyana horsfieldi
Spilosoma obliqua
Subfamily Lymantriinae (hairy caterpillars)
Euproctis limbalis
Yellow-tail moth, Euproctis similis
Euproctis virguncula
Tussock moths
Arna micronides
Nygmia amplior
Orvasca subnotata
Family Hesperiidae
Rice skipper butterfly, Pelopidas mathias
Family Noctuidae
Black cutworm, Agrotis ipsilon
Sesamia inferens
African maize stalk borer, Busseola fusca
Subfamily Hadeninae (armyworms)
Mythimna spp.
Mythimna separata
Mythimna loreyi
Subfamily Noctuinae (armyworms)
Spodoptera spp.
African armyworm, Spodoptera exempta
Red tef worm, Mentaxya ignicollis
Subfamily Heliothinae
Cotton bollworm, Helicoverpa armigera
Millet head miner moth, Heliocheilus albipunctella
Subfamily Acontiinae
Autoba silicula
Subfamily Aganainae
Asota plaginota
Subfamily Catocalinae
Mocis frugalis
Family Pyralidae
Subfamily Galleriinae
African sugarcane stalk borer, Eldana saccharina
Subfamily Phycitinae
Honey dew moth, Cryptoblabes gnidiella
Green-striped borer, Maliarpha separatella

Diptera
Family Cecidomyiidae (midges)
Sorghum midge, Stenodiplosis sorghicola
Millet midge, Geromyia penniseti
Family Muscidae
Shoot flies, Atherigona
Atherigona approximata (pearl millet shoot fly): affects Pennisetum typhoides, Sorghum bicolor
Atherigona atripalpis (foxtail millet shoot fly): affects Setaria italica
Atherigona biseta: affects Setaria italica, Setaria viridis
Atherigona falcata (barnyard millet shoot fly): affects Echinochloa colona, Echinochloa frumentacea, Echinochloa stagnina, Panicum sumatrense
Atherigona hyalinipennis (teff shoot fly)
Atherigona miliaceae (finger millet shoot fly or little millet shoot fly): affects Panicum miliaceum, Panicum sumatrense
Atherigona naqvii (wheat stem fly): affects Triticum aestivum, Zea mays
Atherigona orientalis (tomato fly or pepper fruit fly)
Atherigona oryzae (rice shoot fly): affects Oryza sativa, Paspalum scrobiculatum, Triticum aestivum, Zea mays
Atherigona pulla (proso millet shoot fly): affects Panicum miliaceum, Panicum sumatrense, Paspalum scrobiculatum, Setaria italica
Atherigona punctata (Coimbatore wheat stem fly): affects Triticum aestivum
Atherigona reversura (bermudagrass stem maggot): affects Cynodon dactylon (turf grasses)
Atherigona simplex (kodo millet shoot fly): affects Paspalum scrobiculatum
Atherigona soccata (sorghum shoot fly): affects Sorghum bicolor, Zea mays, Eleusine coracana

Hemiptera
Family Cicadellidae
Maize leafhopper, Cicadulina mbila
Rice green leafhopper, Nephotettix cincticeps
Leafhopper, Empoasca flavescens
Family Delphacidae
Shoot bug, Peregrinus maidis
Brown planthopper, Nilaparvata lugens
Planthopper, Sogatella furcifera
Family Derbidae
Planthopper, Proutista moesta
Family Lophopidae
Sugarcane leafhopper, Pyrilla perpusilla
Family Pseudococcidae
Rice mealybug, Brevennia rehi
Family Cydnidae
Burrowing bugs, Stibaropus
Family Alydidae
Paddy earhead bug, Leptocorisa acuta
Riptortus linearis
Family Coreidae
Rice stink bug, Cletus punctiger
Leptoglossus phyllopus
Family Blissidae
Chinch bugs, Blissus leucopterus
Family Lygaeidae
False chinch bug, Nysius niger
Spilostethus pandurus
Spilostethus hospes
Family Meenoplidae
Plant hopper, Nisia atrovenosa
Family Miridae
Sorghum head bug, Calocoris angustatus
Eurystylus bellevoyei
Creontiades pallidus
Family Pentatomidae
Stink bug, Dolycoris indicus
Green stink bug, Nezara viridula
Family Pyrrhocoridae
Red cotton bug, Dysdercus koenigii
Family Pseudococcidae
Rice mealybug, Brevennia rehi
Family Aphididae (aphids)
Sugarcane aphid, Melanaphis sacchari
Corn aphid, Rhopalosiphum maidis
Anoecia spp.
Anoecia corni
Anoecia cornicola
Anoecia krizusi
Anoecia vagans
Aphis fabae
Aphis gossypii
Aphis spiraecola
Brachycaudus helichrysi
Sugarcane woolly aphid, Ceratovacuna lanigera
Diuraphis noxia
Forda formicaria
Forda marginata
Forda hirsuta
Forda orientalis
Geoica lucifuga
Geoica utricularia
Mealy plum aphid, Hyalopterus pruni
Rusty plum aphid, Hysteroneura setariae
Melanaphis pyraria
Melanaphis sorghi
Rose-grass aphid, Metopolophium dirhodum
Myzus persicae
Neomyzus circumflexus
Paracletus cimiciformis
Protaphis middletonii
Rhopalosiphum nymphaeae
Rhopalosiphum padi
Rhopalosiphum rufiabdominale
Greenbug, Schizaphis graminum
Yellow sorghum aphid, Sipha flava
Sipha elegans
Sipha maydis
Sitobion africanum
Sitobion avenae
Sitobion graminis
Sitobion indicum
Sitobion leelamaniae
Indian grain aphid, Sitobion miscanthi
Sitobion pauliani
Smynthurodes betae
Tetraneura spp.
Tetraneura nigriabdominalis
Tetraneura africana
Tetraneura caerulescens
Tetraneura chui
Tetraneura basui
Tetraneura javensis
Tetraneura capitata
Tetraneura triangula

Thrips (Thysanoptera)
Chaetanaphothrips orchidii
Florithrips traegardhi
Haplothrips aculeatus
Heliothrips indicus
Selenothrips rubrocinctus
Sorghothrips jonnaphilus
Stenchaetothrips biformis
Thrips hawaiiensis

Coleoptera
Flea beetles (Chrysomelidae)
Altica cyanea
Altica caerulea
Chaetocnema basalis
Phyllotreta spp.
Leaf beetles (Chrysomelidae)
Cereal leaf beetle, Oulema melanopus
Aulacophora foveicollis
Rice hispa, Dicladispa armigera
Tef epilachna beetle, Chnootriba similis
Blister beetles (Meloidae)
Cylindrothorax tenuicollis
Mylabris pustulata
Scarabaeidae
White grubs, Phyllophaga spp. and Holotrichia spp.
Chafer beetles
Chiloloba acuta
Oxycetonia versicolor
Torynorrhina flammea
False wireworms (Tenebrionidae)
Gonocephalum
Weevils (Curculionidae)
Ash weevil, Myllocerus
Argentine stem weevil, Listronotus bonariensis
Leaf weevil, Tanymecus indicus

Orthoptera
Acrididae
Acrida exaltata
Aiolopus longicornis
Diabolocatantops axillaris
Hieroglyphus banian
Hieroglyphus nigrorepletus
Hieroglyphus daganensis
Locusta migratoria
Red locust, Nomadacris septemfasciata
Oedaleus senegalensis
Oxya nitidula
Paracinema tricolor
Schistocerca gregaria
Pyrgomorphidae
Atractomorpha crenulata
Chrotogonus hemipterus
Tettigoniidae
Conocephalus maculatus
Wello-bush cricket, Decticoides brevipennis
Armored bush cricket, Acanthoplus longipes

Termites (Isoptera)
Odontotermes obesus
Microtermes obesi

Hymenoptera
Wasps (Eurytomidae)
Stem boring wasp, Eurytomocharis eragrostidis
Ants (Formicidae)
Monomorium salomonis

See also
List of pearl millet diseases
List of sorghum diseases

References